Scymnodalatias is a genus of squaliform sharks in the family Somniosidae.

Species
 Scymnodalatias albicauda Taniuchi & Garrick, 1986 (whitetail dogfish)
 †Scymnodalatias cigalafulgosii (Adnet, 2006)
 Scymnodalatias garricki Kukuev & Konovalenko, 1988 (Azores dogfish)
 Scymnodalatias oligodon Kukuev & Konovalenko, 1988 (sparsetooth dogfish)
 Scymnodalatias sherwoodi (Archey, 1921) (Sherwood's dogfish)

References

 

 
Shark genera
Taxa named by Jack Garrick